Rock 'N Roll Frankenstein is a 1999 American horror comedy film that was directed by Brian O'Hara. The film had its world premiere on 18 September 1999 at the Helsinki International Film Festival and stars Graig Guggenheim, Jayson Spence, Barry Feterman and Hiram Jacob Segarra.

Plot
The movie follows Bernie, a record producer who persuades his nephew Frankie to create a new rock star that will help Bernie overcome his work related ennui. Iggy, the burnt-out roadie pillages the graves of various celebrities, such as Buddy Holly, Jimi Hendrix, and Sid Vicious, using the head of Elvis Presley to top things off.

Cast
Barry Feterman as Bernie Stein
Hiram Jacob Segarra as Iggy
Andrew Hurley as Curly
Ted Travelstead as Pete
Graig Guggenheim as The Monster, a.k.a. 'King'
Jayson Spence as Frankie Stein

Reception
The film has a rating of 60% on Rotten Tomatoes, based on five reviews, with an average rating of 6.1/10.

Awards
Best Gratuitous Use of Violence Award at the Melbourne Underground Film Festival (2001, won)

References

External links
 

1999 films
Frankenstein films
American comedy horror films
1990s comedy horror films
1999 comedy films
1990s American films